Operation Gallop was a Soviet Army operation on the Eastern Front of World War II. The operation was part of a series of counteroffensives after the encirclement of Stalingrad (now Volgograd) following the German Summer offensive in 1942. The Soviet High Command expected a collapse of the German front line in southern Russia and northeast Ukraine and launched a number of counteroffensives to exploit the weak German situation. The operation was launched on 29 January 1943 in conjunction with Operation Star and aimed against Voroshilovgrad (Luhansk), Donetsk, and then towards the Sea of Azov to cut off all German forces east of Donetsk. It  was conducted by the Southwestern Front, commanded by Nikolai Fyodorovich Vatutin. The offensive was initially successful as the Soviets broke through the weak German lines. The Germans were pushed back to a line west of Voroshilovgrad.

In face of a total collapse in the south the German command arranged a number of reorganisations and created a new Army Group South out of the shattered forces of the old Army Groups A, B and Don, under the command of Erich von Manstein. The Soviet offensives, initially successful, ultimately outran their supply lines, and during a counteroffensive at Kharkov, the Germans were able to regain the momentum. The result would be a last German strategic offensive at Kursk.

See also
 Case Blue

References

Bibliography
 
 
 

Battles and operations of World War II
Battles and operations of the Soviet–German War
Battles of World War II involving Germany
Battles involving the Soviet Union
Strategic operations of the Red Army in World War II
Military operations of World War II involving Germany
January 1943 events
February 1943 events